The 1961–62 National Football League was the 31st staging of the National Football League (NFL), an annual Gaelic football tournament for the Gaelic Athletic Association county teams of Ireland.

The final featured on the Amharc Éireann newsreel. Seán O'Neill scored a late penalty to win the game.

Format

Results

Finals

References

External links
, highlights from Gael-Linn

National Football League
National Football League
National Football League (Ireland) seasons